Joseph Athanase Doumer, commonly known as Paul Doumer (22 March 18577 May 1932), was the president of France from 13 June 1931 until his assassination on 7 May 1932.

Early life
Joseph Athanase Doumer was born in Aurillac, in the Cantal département, in France on  22 March 1857, into a family of modest means. Alumnus of the Conservatoire National des Arts et Métiers, he became a professor of mathematics at Mende in 1877.

In 1878 Doumer married Blanche Richel, whom he had met at college.  They had eight children, four of whom were killed in the First World War (including the French air ace René Doumer).

Career 
From 1879 until 1883 Doumer was professor at Remiremont, before leaving on health grounds. He then became chief editor of Courrier de l'Aisne, a French regional newspaper. Initiated into Freemasonry in 1879, at "L'Union Fraternelle" lodge, he became Grand Secretary of Grand Orient de France in 1892.

He made his debut in politics in 1885 as chef de cabinet to Charles Floquet, then president of the Chamber of Deputies (a post equivalent to the speaker of the House of Commons). In 1888, Doumer was elected Radical deputy for the department of Aisne. Defeated in the general elections of September 1889, he was elected again in 1890 by the arrondissement of Auxerre. He was briefly Minister of Finance of France (1895–1896) when he tried without success to introduce an income tax.

Doumer was Governor-General of French Indochina from 1897 to 1902. Upon his arrival the colonies were losing millions of francs annually. Determined to put them on a paying basis, he levied taxes on opium, wine and the salt trade. The Vietnamese, Cambodians and Laotians who could not or would not pay these taxes, lost their houses and land, and often became day laborers. He established Indochina as a market for French products and a source of profitable investment by French businessmen. Doumer set about outfitting Indochina, especially Hanoi, the capital, with modern infrastructure befitting property of France. Tree-lined avenues and a large number of French colonial buildings were constructed in Hanoi during his governance. The Long Bien Bridge and the Grand Palais in Hanoi were among large-scale projects built during his term; the bridge was originally named after him. The palace was destroyed by airstrikes toward the end of WWII. The bridge survived, and became a well-known landmark and target for US pilots during the Vietnam War.

With a view to annexing south Yunnan to French Indochina, Doumer successfully lobbied the French government to approve construction of the Indochina-Yunnan railway in 1898.

After returning to France, Doumer was elected by Laon to the Chamber of Deputies as a Radical. He refused to support the ministry of Émile Combes, and formed a Radical dissident group, which grew in strength and eventually caused the fall of the ministry. He then served as President of the Chamber from 1902 to 1905.

Doumer became Minister of Finance of France again in 1925 when Louis Loucheur resigned. He then served as President of the French Senate from 1927 until the 1931 presidential election. He was elected President of the French Republic on 13 May 1931, defeating the better known Aristide Briand, and replacing Gaston Doumergue.

Assassination

On 6 May 1932, Paul Doumer was in Paris at the opening of a book fair at the Hôtel Salomon de Rothschild, talking to author Claude Farrère.  Suddenly several shots were fired by Paul Gorguloff, a Russian émigré.  Two of the shots hit Doumer, at the base of the skull and in the right armpit, and he fell to the ground.  Claude Farrère wrestled with the assassin before the police arrived.  Doumer was rushed to the hospital in Paris, where he died at 04:37 on 7 May.  He is the only French president to die of a gunshot wound.

André Maurois was an eyewitness to the assassination, having come to the book fair to autograph copies of his book. He later described the scene in his autobiography, "Call No Man Happy". As Maurois notes, because the President was assassinated at a meeting of writers, it was decided that writers - Maurois among them - should stand guard over the body while he lay in state at the Élysée.

Writings
As an author he is known by his L'Indo-Chine française (1904), and Le Livre de mes fils (1906).

See also
 List of Finance Ministers of France
 Politics of France
 Friends of the Natural History Museum Paris, of which he was one of the founders and the second president, in office from 1922 to 1931.

References

External links
 

|-

|-

|-

|-

|-

1857 births
1932 deaths
1932 murders in France
20th-century presidents of France
20th-century Princes of Andorra
People from Aurillac
Presidents of the Chamber of Deputies (France)
Governors-General of French Indochina
French colonial governors and administrators
Politicians of the French Third Republic
Presidents of the Senate (France)
French Senators of the Third Republic
Assassinated French politicians
Assassinated heads of state
Deaths by firearm in France
People murdered in Paris
Male murder victims
French Ministers of Finance
French Freemasons
Senators of Corsica
1932 in Paris
Conservatoire national des arts et métiers alumni
Grand Crosses of the Order of Saint-Charles
1930s murders in Paris